Publius Sestius Capitolinus Vaticanus (  452–451 BC) was a Roman politician in the 5th century BC, consul in 452 BC and decemvir in 451 BC.

Family
He was a member of the Gens Sestii. He was the son of Quintus and his complete name is Publius Sestius Q.f. Vibi.n. Capitolinus Vaticanus. Livy gives the form Sextius then Sestius. Dionysius of Halicarnassus uses the form Siccius. His cognomen Capitolinus is not certain - we also see Capito being used. He was the only member of his family to attain the rank of consul.

Biography

Consulship
In 452 BC, he was consul with Titus Menenius Lanatus. During their consulship, the delegates left to study Greek law in Athens. After returning to Rome, the tribunes of the plebs called together officials to create a commission to write the law down. Publius Sestius supported this proposition, contrary to his colleague Titus Menenius, who pondered the question before falling ill - then was rendered inactive until the end of his term as consul. Publius Sestius refused to take sole initiative in creating the commission, and so deferred the decision to the following year.<ref>Dionysius of Halicarnassus, Roman Antiquities, X. 54</ref>

Decemvirate
In 451 BC, because of his vocal support, he was taken into the first commission of the decemvirs which drew up the first ten tables of the Law of the Twelve Tables.Diodorus Siculus, Bibliotheca Historica, XII. 9

References

 Bibliography 

Ancient bibliography
 Livy, Ab urbe condita  Diodorus Siculus, Universal History, Book XII, 9 at Philippe Remacle
 Dionysius of Halicarnassus, Roman Antiquities'', Book X, 1-16, and Book X, 45-63 at LacusCurtius

Modern bibliography
 

5th-century BC Roman consuls
Ancient Roman decemvirs
Publius, Capitolinus Vaticanus